Bedtime Stories was an anthology series of six plays that were '1974 versions of well-loved tales' and intended as a sequel to 1972's Dead of Night. The series aired on BBC Two from 3 March 1974 to 7 April 1974. Writers for the series included Alan Plater, Nigel Kneale and Andrew Davies. The series was produced by Innes Lloyd and script edited by Louis Marks. Two episodes, Sleeping Beauty and Jack and the Beanstalk are believed to have been wiped.

1: Goldilocks and the Three Bears
Cast:
Charles Lloyd-Pack as Narrator
Angharad Rees as Miss Goldie
Bryan Pringle as Arthur Burr
Rosemary Leach as Ivy Burr
Dai Bradley as Lennie Burr
John Hartley as Simon
George Waring as Harry
Harold Goodwin as Joe
Frank Mills as Mr. Mills

Written by Alan Plater. Directed by Jonathan Alwyn.

2: The Water Maiden
Cast:
Jeff Rawle as Colin
Lisa Harrow as Marianne
Freddie Fletcher as Liam
Cheryl Hall as Linda
Avril Elgar as Colin's Mother
Graham Ashley as Councillor Phillips
Paul Moriarty as Bob
Brian Pettifer as Alan
Rayner Bourton as Fox
Martin Skinner as Fox's friend

Written by Andrew Davies.  Directed by Kenneth Ives.

3: Sleeping Beauty
Cast:
John Franklyn-Robbins as Narrator
Ciaran Madden as Clare Rawley
Richard Morant as Stephen Grant
Diana Quick as Anna Carpenter
Esmond Knight as Vere Rawley
Adrienne Corri as Constance Rawley
Kathleen Michael as Bess Robson
John Saunders as Bertram
Anne Ridler as Doctor Harrington
Richard Steele as Doctor Porter

Written by Julian Bond. Directed by David Maloney.

4: Jack and the Beanstalk
Cast
Martin Thurley as Jonathan Weir
Stephanie Bidmead as Linda Weir
Glyn Owen as Duggie Weir
Peter Jeffrey as Nethercoat
Keith Marsh as Skinner
Miranda Hampton as Marcia
Ian Haliburton as Mike
Denis Gilmore as Fuller
Will Stampe as Vic
Julie May as Dorrie
Liz Smith as Miss Long

Written by Nigel Kneale. Directed by Paul Ciappessoni.

5: Hansel and Gretel
Cast
Raymond Francis as Harry
Brenda Bruce as Gertie
Gwen Watford as Irene James
Michael Graham Cox as Chris
Gillian Rhind as Jill

Written by Louis Marks.  Directed by Roger Jenkins.

6: The Snow Queen
Cast
Peter Turner as Kay
Veronica Roberts as Gerda
Richard Butler as Major Burton
Eve Pearce as Mrs. Burton
Julian Holloway as Hale Patterson
Fiona Walker as Brenda Patterson
Lesley-Anne Down as Monica
Andee Cromarty as Charlie
Martin Howells as Derek
Rosalind Elliott as The Robber Girl
Garrick Hagon as Chris
Natalie Kent as Mrs. Harris
Margot Thomas as Samaritan

Written by John Bowen.  Directed by Paul Ciappessoni.

1974 British television series debuts
1974 British television series endings
1974 television plays